Remus is the given name of:

 Remus Cernea (born 1974), Romanian activist
 Remus Dănălache (born 1984), Romanian football goalkeeper
 Remus Koffler (1902–1954), Romanian communist activist
 Remus Opreanu (1844–1908), Romanian jurist and politician
 Remus Opriș (born 1958), Romanian politician and psychiatrist
 Remus Pricopie (born 1970), Romanian Education Minister
 Remus Răduleț (1904–1984), Romanian electrical engineer
 Remus von Woyrsch (1847–1920), Prussian field marshal who fought in World War I

Fictional characters
 Uncle Remus, the fictional title character and narrator of a collection of African American folktales
 Remus Lupin, a character in the Harry Potter novels
 Remus, the protagonist of the Kashubian novel The Life and Adventures of Remus
 Remus Sanders, the personification of "forbidden creativity" from the Sanders Sides web series, played by Thomas Sanders

Romanian masculine given names